The Xindong Bridge is a bridge connecting Gongguan Township and Miaoli City in Miaoli County, Taiwan.

History
The construction of the bridge began in 1995 and was completed in 1997.

Technical specifications
The total length of the bridge is 326 meters with its main span spans over a length of 176 meters. It carries 4 lanes of traffic in its 21 meters width and it crosses the Houlong River.

See also
 List of bridges in Taiwan

References

1997 establishments in Taiwan
Bridges completed in 1997
Bridges in Taiwan
Buildings and structures in Miaoli County
Transportation in Miaoli County